Kindred is one's family and relations by kinship. It may also refer to:

In media

Literature
 Kindred (novel), a 1979 science fiction novel by American writer Octavia E. Butler
 Kindred (book), a 2020 book by Rebecca Wragg Sykes

Film
 Kindred (film), a 2020 British horror film
 The Kindred (1987 film), an American horror film
 The Kindred (2021 film), a British horror film

Television
 Kindred (TV series), a 2022 television series based on the Butler novel
 Kindred: The Embraced, an American television series produced by John Leekley Productions and Spelling Television
 "Kindred" (Heroes), the third episode of the second season of the NBC science fiction drama series Heroes
 "Kindred", an episode in the fourth season of the animated series Star Wars Rebels
 "The Kindred" (Stargate Atlantis), an episode in the fourth season of Stargate Atlantis

Music
Kindred (Jacky Terrasson and Stefon Harris album), 2001
 Kindred, a 2011 album by Farpoint
 Kindred (EP), by Burial, 2012
 Kindred (Passion Pit album), 2015
 The Kindred (band), a Canadian progressive rock sextet
 Kindred the Family Soul AKA Kindred, an American neo soul duo

Games
 Police Quest III: The Kindred, an adventure game produced by Jim Walls for Sierra On-Line

Fictional elements
 Kindred (Image Comics), a fictional group of humanoid animals
 Kindred (Marvel Comics), a villain of Spider-Man
 Kindred, an Amish-like community in The X-Files episode "Gender Bender"
 Kindred, a character from League of Legends who is a personification of death consisting of a duo of lamb and wolf

People
 Dave Kindred (born 1941), American Sportswriter
 Flash Flanagan (born Christopher Kindred, 1974), American professional wrestler
 John J. Kindred (1864–1937), U.S. Representative from New York
 Lisa Kindred (1940–2019), American folk and blues singer
 Nyree Kindred (born 1980), Welsh swimmer
 Parker Kindred, American drummer
 Sascha Kindred (born 1977), British swimmer
 Kindred McLeary (1901–1949), American architect, artist, and educator
 Kindred Jenkins Morris (1819–1884), American Democratic politician
 Philip K. Dick (Philip Kindred Dick), American science fiction writer

Other
 Kindred, a six-row, rough-awned, medium-early Manchurian-type malting cultivar of barley
 Kindred Group, an online gambling operator
 Kindred Healthcare, a healthcare services company
 Kindred (Heathenism), a local worship group and organizational unit in the Heathen movements
 Kindred, North Dakota, a city in Cass County, North Dakota, United States
 Kindred, Tasmania, a locality in Australia

See also
 Kindred Spirits (disambiguation)